Truly Hatchett (June 17, 1881 - April 1, 1970) was a real estate investor and state legislator in Maryland. He and Emery Cole were the first African Americans to serve in the Maryland House of Delegates. He joined the House on November 2, 1954. He represented Baltimore. He was a Democrat. In 1928, he served as Exalted Ruler of the Monument Lodge of Benevolent and Protective Order of Elks.

He had two brothers, a half-brother, and three half-sisters.

See also
 List of African-American officeholders (1900–1959)
Harry A. Cole

References

1881 births
1970 deaths
20th-century African-American politicians
20th-century American politicians
African-American state legislators in Maryland
Businesspeople from Baltimore
Politicians from Baltimore
American real estate businesspeople
20th-century American businesspeople
African-American investors
Maryland Democrats